The Grove Church Shale is a geologic formation in Indiana.

References

Geology of Indiana